Kheyrabad-e Kaffah (also Romanized as Kheyrābād-e Kaffah; also known as Khairābād and Kheyrābād) is a village in Sharifabad Rural District, in the Central District of Sirjan County, Kerman Province, Iran. At the 2006 census, its population was 107, in 33 families.

References 

Populated places in Sirjan County